Multilingual education typically refers to "first-language-first" education, that is, schooling which begins in the mother tongue and transitions to additional languages.  Typically MLE programs are situated in developing countries where speakers of minority languages, i.e. non-dominant languages, tend to be disadvantaged in the mainstream education system. There are increasing calls to provide first-language-first education to immigrant children from immigrant parents who have moved to the developed  world.

Components of Multilingual Education (MLE) 

 "Strong Foundation" - Research shows that children whose early education is in the language of their home tend to do better in the later years of their education (Thomas and Collier, 1997).  For more information about the effect of "Language of Instruction", see Bilingual education.
 "Strong Bridge" - an essential difference between MLE programs and rural "mother tongue education" programs is the inclusion of a guided transition from learning through the mother tongue to learning through another tongue.

Related to the emphasis on a child's mother tongue is the implicit validation of her cultural or ethnic identity by taking languages which were previously considered "non-standard" and making active use of them in the classroom.  Multilingual Education in that sense underscores the importance of the child's worldview in shaping his or her learning.

Stages of an MLE program 

A widespread understanding of MLE programs (UNESCO, 2003, 2005) suggests that instruction take place in the following stages:

 Stage I - learning takes place entirely in the child's home language
 Stage II - building fluency in the mother tongue.  Introduction of oral L2.
 Stage III - building oral fluency in L2. Introduction of literacy in L2.
 Stage IV - using both L1 and L2 for lifelong learning.

MLE proponents stress that the second language acquisition component is seen as a "two-way" bridge, such that learners gain the ability to move back and forth between their mother tongue and the other tongue(s), rather than simply a transitional literacy program where reading through the mother tongue is abandoned at some stage in the education.

Based  on the  theories of  Multilingual Education  that are spelled out  here, Andhra Pradesh  and Orissa have adopted a thematic approach  to multilingual education. Using a seasonal calendar within a relevant cultural context has  provided a space to the tribal children of  Orissa  and Andhra Pradesh to rediscover their culture through their language. The Multilingual  Education  in this approach  emphasizes  first  language first  in the  child  taking  the  socio- cultural curriculum  in to classroom  culture  and   then  bridge  to  second  language.
In addition to the  basic theory of Paulo Freire on critical pedagogy, Gramscian  theory on education,  Lev  Vigostky's scaffolding  and Piaget's  theory  of cognition is applied in the  Multilingual Education. The unique  thing in  this  approach is to  involve the community   in creating their  own  curriculum  and  minimise the  theoretical hegemony, thereby  creating  a new set of people who believe in the ethics of creating  and  sharing knowledge for the society than to  limit  it to the  theoreticians.

Multilingual education in Odisha
  
Odisha is a multilingual state having more than  40  ethnic languages among the 62  scheduled tribes, along with the   Modern  Indian  Languages like  Hindi, Bengali and  Telugu. To address the language-  education of ethnic minorities children in schools, the Odisha government started Multilingual Education programme, ten tribal languages. Led by  Dr Mahendra Kumar Mishra, as the  Director of Multilingual Education and guided by Prof. D P Pattanayak and  Prof Khageswar  Mahapatra, the eminent multilingual  Experts, the state government started  MLE  programme in te tribal languages in 547  schools. 10 tribal languages were adopted. These are Santali, Saora,  Kui, Kuvi, Koya, Kishan, Oroam, Juang, Bonda and Ho.  Culturally responsive curriculum and textbooks were prepared for class I to   Class  V  to maintain mother tongue-based multilingual education to educate the tribal children.  The state government appointed teachers from the same language community in the schools to teach the tribal children. Language policy was also formulated. The programme was also supported by Summer Institute of Linguistics led by Mr Steve Simpson and Vicky Simpson, Pamela Mackenzie.  The curriculum and textbooks were prepared by the tribal teachers guided by the MLE resource groups.  It was initiated in  2005 and is now running in   2250 schools with majority tribal children.  This is a sustained MLE programme in Asian countries. About  7  Asian countries have visited the  MLE schools.

Multilingual education in developed countries 
Scholars and educators have argued that embracing the diverse linguistic knowledge that immigrant students bring to the developed countries, such as the United States, and using students’ first-languages to help them learn English may be an inexpensive and effective way to integrate and socialize immigrant youth. Allowing code-switching in schools with high English learner (EL) populations can increase the potential for enhanced English-learning and academic performance. Code-switching between multi-lingual children can create an informal peer-mentorship structure that embraces immigrant children's linguistic capabilities to drive learning, create a strong peer-network, and enhance the development of English as a Second Language skills for immigrant students in multi-ethnic schools.

 Dr Mahendra  Kumar Mishra started the MLE programme in Chhattisgarh adopting Durua language in  MLE programme. Dr Mishra conducted 2 NAtional Seminars and one international Seminar on MLE  during  2006-2019. Dr Tove Skutnabb Kangas, Prof Ofelia Gracia, Dr David Haugh, Dr Sitakanta Mahapatra, Dr KHageswar Mohapatra were some of the linguists and multilingual educators attended these conferences.

See also
Language education
Linguistic diversity
Multilingualism
Multilingual education in Africa
Bilingual education
Multilingual Education Programs (SIL)
Mother Tongue / Biliteracy Programs (UNESCO) 
Multilingual Education in India, The CAse For English  Edited by  Dr MAhendra Kumar Mishra and Prof Anand Mahanand published by Viva Books, New Delhi  2016.

References 

For further information, please refer to the MLE Manual of Susan Malone, and Denis Malone published by UNESCO, Bangkok
id21 insights.  Available online at 
Cenoz, Jasone. 2009. Towards Multilingual Education. Bristol: Multilingual Matters 
 Hult, F.M.  (2012). Ecology and multilingual education. In C. Chapelle (Gen. Ed.), Encyclopedia of applied linguistics (Vol. 3, pp. 1835-1840).  Malden, MA: Wiley-Blackwell.
NMRC - National Multilingual Education Resource Center (JNU, India)  
UNESCO. 2003. Education in a multilingual world.  Available online here.
UNESCO. 2005. First Language First: community based literacy programmes for minority language contexts in Asia.  Available online here.
Walter, Steven.  2000. Explaining Multilingual Education:. Information on Some Tough Questions, University of North Dakota Working Papers in Linguistics.  Available online here.
Multilingual Education in India, The Csse For English Edited by Dr MAhendra Kumar Mishra and Prof Anand Mahanand published by Viva Books, New Delhi 2016.

External links 
Zsuzsanna Fagyal Lecture: Implementing M+2: Multilingual Education in the EU - European Union Center at the University of Illinois, Urbana-Champaign.
Carole Benson, The importance of mother tongue-based schooling for educational quality (2004), UNESCO.
Kosonen, Kimmo. First Language–Based Multilingual Education Can Help Those Excluded by Language. Payap University. Chaing Mai.

Education by subject
Linguistic rights
Multilingualism
Educational programs
Education issues